Couchwood is the summer estate of Harvey C. Couch, an industrialist and founder of Arkansas Power and Light in the early 20th century.  The estate, located at 601 Couchwood Road, is southeast of Hot Springs, Arkansas, straddling the border of Garland and Hot Spring counties on the north shore of Lake Catherine.

The  estate was listed on the National Register of Historic Places for two separate reasons.  It was first listed on 1986 for the five naturalistic sculptures by Dionicio Rodriguez that are located on the property; these were commissioned by Couch.  The estate was again listed on 2001 for its association with Couch, and for its well-preserved collection of Rustic architecture. Several of the estate's eight buildings were designed by the noted Arkansas architect John Parks Almand.

Presidents Hoover and Roosevelt both spent time at Couchwood as guests. There are five red cedar log-houses on the estate: the Big House, Calhoun, Little Pine Bluff, Remmelwood and the Traincar.

Today, the estate serves as a retreat for descendants and visitors. The estate is sometimes available for renting for such purposes as weddings, business trips or as a vacation getaway.

Gallery

See also
National Register of Historic Places listings in Garland County, Arkansas
National Register of Historic Places listings in Hot Spring County, Arkansas

References

External links
 Couchwood
 Encyclopedia of Arkansas History & Culture: Couchwood Historic District

Buildings and structures completed in 1939
Houses in Garland County, Arkansas
Houses in Hot Spring County, Arkansas
Historic districts on the National Register of Historic Places in Arkansas
National Register of Historic Places in Garland County, Arkansas
Rustic architecture in Arkansas
1939 establishments in Arkansas
Outdoor sculptures in Arkansas